MetroCentro is a tram system serving the centre of the city Seville, in Andalusia, Spain. It began operating in October 2007. The tram is operated by TUSSAM (Transportes Urbanos de Sevilla, Sociedad Anónima Municipal), which is a municipally owned corporation tasked with the operation of the bus and tram system of Seville.

The tram has connections with the Seville Metro and Cercanías Sevilla (commuter rail).

Overview
At the present time, the service consists of just five stops, Plaza Nueva, Archivo de Indias, Puerta de Jerez, Prado de San Sebastián and San Bernardo, as part of Phase I of the project. The service is expected to be extended to Santa Justa AVE station, including four new stops: San Francisco Javier, Eduardo Dato, Luis de Morales and Santa Justa. This Phase II was due to start in late 2008, but was postponed until 2018. City council gave priority to extending the lines of the Seville Metro.

The project works began in mid-2005 and its first phase was completed by Autumn 2007. It covers 1.4 km and is served by seven CAF Urbos trams.

Movement without catenary

From the start it was envisaged that part of the Metrocentro system should be able to run free from using the overhead contact wire for power. The city had initially forecast that the catenaries would be removed from the area surrounding the cathedral by 2008. On several occasions the City of Seville administration had to dismantle the overhead wires to allow, at Easter, processions to pass without restriction; the builder of the rolling stock paid the extra cost for this.

Initially, the system operated using the vehicles of the Seville Metro, which did not start operating until 2009. The final system, which is now in use since the Holy Week in 2011, uses a technology called ACR (Acumulador de Carga Rápida), which are fast charging batteries that were developed and patented by CAF.

Expansion plans

The Seville city government announced in March 2018 that the tram line would be extended from its current terminus at San Bernardo station to the Santa Justa train station, facilitating transfers with high-speed AVE and other intercity lines.
The extension would be tunneled for a short distance on Avenida de Ramón y Cajal to Avenida San Francisco Javier and otherwise run in the median of the street. In total, four additional stops would be added to the line. The project is projected to cost 49 million euros with completion in 2020.

See also 
Seville Metro
 Supercapacitor

References

Seville Metro
Seville
Seville